Wolf chess (German: Wolf-Schach) is a chess variant invented by Dr. Arno von Wilpert in 1943. It is played on an 8×10 chessboard and employs several fairy pieces including wolf and fox – compound pieces popular in chess variants and known by different names.

Wolf chess correspondence matches and tournaments have been held, one of which (Paris vs. Augsburg, September 1960) is claimed to be the first international  match for a chess variant.

Game rules

As in standard chess, White moves first and the winning objective is checkmate. The king, queen, rook, bishops, and pawns move and capture the same as they do in chess. In addition, there are some special rules.

Special rules
 The wolf moves and captures as a chess rook and a chess knight.
 The fox moves and captures as a chess bishop and a chess knight.
 The nightrider moves and captures as a chess knight extended to make any number of steps in the same direction in a straight line.
 A sergeant moves and captures one step straight or diagonally forward. A sergeant has the option, like a chess pawn, to move a double-step straight forward (but not diagonally) on its first move.
 A pawn (but not a sergeant) may capture an enemy pawn or sergeant en passant.
 Pawns and sergeants promote on the last  to: queen, wolf, fox, rook, bishop, or nightrider. Pawns (but not sergeants) have an additional option of promoting to elephant (also called Amazon rider in pocket mutation chess). The elephant piece is not present in the starting setup; it moves and captures as a chess queen and a nightrider (stronger than an amazon).
 There is no castling in wolf chess.

References

Bibliography

 Wilpert, Arno von (1959). Wolf-Schach. Kommissions-Verlag Heinz Loeffler, Bad Nauheim (Germany).

External links
Wolf chess by Hans Bodlaender, The Chess Variant Pages
Wolf Chess a simple program by Ed Friedlander (Java)
Wolf Chess See detailed rule descriptions, piece movements and play this variant on Omnichess

Chess variants
1943 in chess
Board games introduced in 1943